The 1989–90 season of the División de Honor de Futsal was the 1st season of top-tier futsal in Spain.

Regular season

First round

Group A

Group B

Group C

Group D

(1) 2 penalty points

Second round

Group A

Group B

Playoffs

External links
1989–90 season at lnfs.es

See also
División de Honor de Futsal
Futsal in Spain

1989 90
Spain
futsal